Albert Morris Rector (June 23, 1934 – March 30, 2005) was a Canadian politician. He served in the Legislative Assembly of New Brunswick from 1991 to 1995, as a Confederation of Regions Party member for the constituency of Oromocto.

References

1934 births
2005 deaths
New Brunswick Confederation of Regions Party MLAs
People from Cumberland County, Nova Scotia
People from Sunbury County, New Brunswick